The U.S. Post Office, now known as the Springer Cultural Center, is a historic government building located at Randolph and Church Streets in Champaign, Illinois. Built in 1905, the building originally served as Champaign's post office. The office of Supervising Architect James Knox Taylor designed the Beaux-Arts building. The brick building features extensive limestone and terra cotta ornamentation. The front facade has four pairs of Ionic pilasters separating the entrance and two sets of windows. A frieze reading "UNITED STATES POST OFFICE" and a dentillated cornice run above the pilasters. A balustrade runs along the front edge of the roof; a large scrolled cartouche marks the center of the balustrade. In 1966, the post office was converted to a federal building.

The building was listed on the National Register of Historic Places in 1976.

It was deeded to the Champaign Park District in 1991.

See also 
List of United States post offices

References 

Beaux-Arts architecture in Illinois
Buildings and structures in Champaign, Illinois
Government buildings completed in 1905
National Register of Historic Places in Champaign County, Illinois
Post office buildings in Illinois
Post office buildings on the National Register of Historic Places in Illinois
1905 establishments in Illinois